Jose Maria Quijano Wallis (July 20, 1847 – March 24, 1922)  was a Colombian lawyer, diplomat, politician and historian.

Life
His parents were Manuel de Jesús Quijano y Ordóñez (born in Latacunga, Ecuador) and Rafaela Wallis y Caldas, daughter of an English physician, George Wallis, and Baltazara Jorge Caldas, younger sister of the wise and patriotic Francisco José de Caldas. He also served as Congressman in both houses, Governor of Cauca, and Secretary Foreign Affairs, of Finance and Development, and of Treasury and Public Credit.

Finished his studies Regidor went from Popayan, 1865 to 1867 to the Legislature of Cauca, and later was Secretary to the Government of that State in 1867, Principal of the College of Popayan and teacher of various kinds in 1869. Deputy to the House of Representatives in 1870 and 71, and Senator in 1872. Back from a trip to Europe was Secretary to the Governor of Cauca and in 1875 the Director of Public Instruction in the State. Again deputy in 1876, he had under his charge the credit portfolio of the Treasury and Office.
 
Later in 1878, he was appointed Chargé d'Affaires and Consul General in the Kingdom of Italy, close to His Majesty the King Umberto, where he remained until 1881. During the time of his stay in Europe travel and study made important and deserved the high honor of receiving the Cross of Commander of the Order of Saints Maurice and Lazarus.

He was elected President of the Colombian Academy of Jurisprudence in 1913.

Selected works
The following is a work authored by Jose Maria Quijano Wallis:

 

Wallis Quijano's work: "Memoirs autobiographical, historical, political and social" in its 40 chapters, containing details and facts unknown at the time of the country's history, important characters, performances and anecdotes such as Julio payaneses Arboleda, José María Obando, Santiago Pérez, Manuel Murillo, Florian Largacha, etc. Relationship of different country's internal wars in the years he was an actor or viewer. He gives many details about his family, ancestors and government actions in the political, diplomatic and management. It is an excellent source of information for those interested in the history of Colombia

 
Studies, speeches and various writings (1908) by José María Quijano Wallis and Carlos Arturo Torres.

 
Reports of Committees of the House of Representatives of Colombia on the request of the great General Mosquera (1923) by  José María Quijano Wallis, Jorge Isaacs and Manuel Urueta.

 
Three speeches in the centenary celebrations (1910) by José María Quijano Wallis

See also
 University of Cauca
 Popayán
 Complutense University of Madrid
 Salvador Camacho
 Ministry of Foreign Affairs (Colombia)
 United States of Colombia
 Liberal Party of Colombia

References

Further reading
 

1827 births
1900 deaths
People from Cauca Department
University of Cauca
Colombian economists
19th-century Colombian lawyers
Colombian sociologists
Members of the Chamber of Representatives of Colombia
Members of the Senate of Colombia
Foreign ministers of Colombia
Colombian Secretaries of Finance and Development
Colombian Secretaries of Treasury and Public Credit